Percy Nestor Joseph Ilott (6 March 1916 – 29 June 2001) was an Australian rules footballer who played with South Melbourne in the Victorian Football League (VFL).

Notes

External links 

1916 births
2001 deaths
Australian rules footballers from Victoria (Australia)
Sydney Swans players